Pullman National Historical Park is a historic district located in Chicago and was the first model, planned industrial community in the United States. The district had its origins in the manufacturing plans and organization of the Pullman Company and became one of the most well-known company towns in the United States, as well as the scene of the violent 1894 Pullman strike. It was built for George Pullman as a place to produce the famous Pullman sleeping cars.

Originally built beyond the Chicago city limits, it is now in what is the Pullman community area of Chicago; the district includes the Pullman factory and the Hotel Florence, named after George Pullman's daughter. Also within the district is the A. Philip Randolph Pullman Porter Museum, named for the prominent labor and civil rights leader A. Philip Randolph, which recognizes and explores African American labor history.  Parts of the site have been more recently owned by the Illinois Historic Preservation Agency prior to being gifted to the federal government. Additional grounds remain owned by the state, as the Pullman State Historic Site. The Pullman District, including the national historical park, state historic site, and private homes is east of Cottage Grove Avenue, from East 103rd St. to East 115th St. It was named a Chicago Landmark district on October 16, 1972.  It was listed on the National Register of Historic Places on October 8, 1969 and declared a National Historic Landmark on December 30, 1970.

Preservationists had hoped to extend the district to include Schlitz Row, but the taverns located there have been demolished. President Barack Obama named the site a national monument on February 19, 2015, making it a component of the National Park System. It was redesignated a National Historical Park in 2022. In celebration of the 2018 Illinois Bicentennial, Pullman was selected as one of the Illinois 200 Great Places by the American Institute of Architects Illinois component and was recognized by USA Today Travel magazine as one of AIA Illinois's selections for Illinois 25 Must See Places.

Background
George Pullman was born in Brocton, New York and studied engineering. By the 1850s, Chicago was emerging as a major city, but faced sanitation issues. Pullman designed a method to raise buildings, which allowed better drainage. This innovation led Pullman to great financial success. With this new-found wealth, Pullman founded the Pullman Palace Car Company to manufacture sleeping cars in 1867. Through a focus on luxury and customer comfort, Pullman gained a large market share in the railroad car sector. The expensive cars were typically rented out to railroads with trained employees, many of whom were former house slaves recently freed by the Emancipation Proclamation.

Pullman was an early advocate of employee welfare in a city that was a hotbed for labor unrest in the 1870s. When a new factory was required to meet demand, Pullman was presented with an opportunity to integrate employee betterment with manufacturing efficiency. He organized the Pullman Land Association to oversee non-manufacturing real estate and transferred all but  to its control.

Solon Spencer Beman was commissioned with the design of the company town buildings, including 1,300 housing units. Nathaniel Franklin Barrett was tasked with the layout and landscape design. Former Chicago superintendent of sewage Benzette Williams developed the utilities and drainage system. The project began in early 1880 and the first factory buildings were nearly completed by fall. Housing was mainly built as red brick rowhouses and featured indoor plumbing. The spacious accommodations were a significant improvement over the tenements that workers were used to. Architecture predominately evoked the Queen Anne style with Romanesque details.

The town was designed with the hope that other companies would want to relocate there. However, only Pullman subsidiaries and suppliers ever shared the campus. Additional housing was built north of the factories after the Union Foundry and Allen Paper Car Company moved their operations there. Beman designed simpler, cheaper housing for these largely unskilled employees. Pullman employees, by contrast, were largely young and skilled. Rents were set to provide a 6% profit to the company over construction costs. By 1883, the population of the community reached 8,000. The community was diverse: by 1885, less than half of the employees were American-born, but African Americans were not allowed to live on the premises. Women were employed by the Pullman Company to sew.

Pullman Strike

The City of Chicago annexed Pullman in 1889, though the Land Association maintained control of town management. The town was not the success that George Pullman envisioned; profits from rent never reached the six percent intended. Pullman was a popular attraction during the 1893 World's Columbian Exposition, as visitors came to see the unusual town advertised in the Transportation Building. However, the Panic of 1893 began that year, devastating the railroad industry. Demand for sleeping cars plummeted, so to maintain a profitable enterprise, Pullman lowered wages for employees. Rents, automatically deducted from paychecks, were not decreased.

Meanwhile, the American Railway Union (ARU), led by Eugene V. Debs, formed in Chicago on June 20, 1893. Membership grew to 150,000, including many of the white workers of Pullman. Pullman employees attempted to use the union to leverage support for wage increases, but their pleas were ignored. On May 11, 1894, employees went on strike. Pullman leadership, however, had put itself in a financial position to withstand a short-term work stoppage as the nation recovered from the financial panic.

To combat this, the ARU launched a boycott on Pullman, where ARU would refuse to run trains with the cars. The extensive use of Pullman cars across the country further crippled the railroad industry and stymied rail traffic. The twenty-four Chicago railroads represented by the General Managers' Association rallied together against the boycott. They used strikebreakers to replace striking workers and convinced lines to run Pullman cars with their mail cars. If strikers shut down lines with mail cars, the federal government would have to intervene as it threatened interstate commerce. Indeed, lines were closed and the government found the boycott in violation of the Sherman Antitrust Act.

Thousands of U.S. Marshals and Army troops were deployed to Chicago to break the boycott. Fights between the workers and the military left dozens dead or injured. After ARU leaders, including Debs, were jailed, the strike and boycott were quelled. Some workers that renounced the union were allowed to return to work. Although the public was generally opposed to the boycott, the strike also tarnished the Pullman brand. Pullman died in 1897 and had his grave sealed in a block of concrete and steel to prevent desecration of his body.

Aftermath
The Pullman Strike changed the American labor landscape. It was an example of the power a union could have against an industry, but it also affirmed the right of the government to intervene against strikes, particularly after the Supreme Court upheld the actions in in re Debs (1895). The Illinois Supreme Court forced the Pullman Company to sell its non-industrial holdings in 1898 and residents were given the first option on purchasing their houses. Most of the land was sold off by 1907.

Under second president Robert Todd Lincoln, Pullman cars were converted to all-steel construction. This required a $5 million investment in remodeling the shops. Despite a brief labor strike in 1904, the Pullman Company restored its place as a leading railcar provider. However, the town never recovered its identity as a company town as employees moved to newer neighborhoods nearby.

Agreement with Brotherhood of Sleeping Car Porters

Unionization of African American workers began in 1925, when the Brotherhood of Sleeping Car Porters was founded by A. Philip Randolph in New York City. Forty-four percent of the Pullman workforce was porters, making Pullman the nation's largest employer of African Americans. A landmark agreement was reached between the two parties in 1937, becoming the first major labor agreement between a company and an African American union. The NAACP lauded the contract and recognized it as an important step in increasing and improving the "respect, recognition and influence, and economic advance" of African Americans.

Competition and the end of rail
The decline of rail usage in favor of cars and aviation led to the decline of the Pullman Company. After a major downsizing in the 1940s, the Pullman Company was largely closed by 1957. It officially ceased operations in 1969. The south wing of the factory and the erecting shops were later used by several steel companies.

Landmarks

Administration and factory complex
The manufacturing center of Pullman, the Administration and Factory Complex were unusually ornate industrial buildings. They were designed to sit in a park-like setting, overlooking the artificial Lake Vista, which was a cooling reservoir for the Corliss steam engine. The buildings, several hundred feet long, were well-lit and ventilated. The main facade, mirrored in the lake, faced the Illinois Central tracks, and thus was one of the first buildings a visitor would see. Beman designed the structures with a linear manufacturing process in mind, making the factory an early adapter of the assembly line.

Hotel Florence

Hotel Florence, named for Pullman's daughter, was opened on November 1, 1881. Intended to showcase the town to visitors, the hotel featured fifty rooms and the only bar in the community. Built at a cost of $130,000, it grew to  after an addition was constructed in 1914. A suite was kept for Pullman on the second floor for when he visited the factory. Each floor presented a different class of service, with the most opulent rooms on the second floor and more modest accommodations on the fourth. It recently completed an extensive rehabilitation, mainly of its first floor and basement. The annex has not been rehabilitated and is closed.

Preservation and rehabilitation
A proposal in 1960 to demolish the community in favor of a new industrial park galvanized residents to form the Pullman Civic Organization (PCO) to support its preservation. On October 8, 1969, the remaining  neighborhood was recognized by the National Park Service (NPS) with a listing on the National Register of Historic Places. The next year, it was recognized as a National Historic Landmark District, a site deemed to have "exceptional value to the nation." The southern portion was locally recognized as a Chicago Landmark on October 16, 1972. A second Chicago Landmark, for the northern portion, was created in 1993, then merged into the other landmark in 1999. The PCO provided grants to help residents restore their houses, and a non-profit called the Historic Pullman Foundation purchased several key buildings for rehabilitation in the 1970s.

The State of Illinois purchased Hotel Florence and the Administration and Factory Complex in 1991 and incorporated it into a state historic site through the Illinois Historic Preservation Agency. However, a 1998 arson destroyed much of the latter building before it could open to visitors. It is now in the process of reconstruction. President Barack Obama designated Pullman as a national monument, thus a component of the NPS, on February 19, 2015. It became the first unit of the NPS in Chicago.  In 2015, the National Parks Conservation Association and the Chicago Chapter of the American Institute of Architects published a report on development for the park.

In 2017, the National Park Service approved a plan to restore the clock tower building and turn it into a visitor center.  The plan also calls for reconstructing the main gateway between the factory and housing areas. Toxic soil had to be first removed from the site.  The soil was contaminated by waste materials when the factory was in use.

The National Park Service unveiled their new visitor center on Labor Day, September 6, 2021. In attendance were local and national officials, including Illinois Governor JB Pritzker, and Secretary of the Interior Deb Haaland. The site is open to the public after a massive restoration of the Administration Building.

The Consolidated Appropriations Act, 2023 redesignated the site as Pullman National Historical Park in December 2022.

Interpretive programs 
Pullman National Historical Park partners with the non-profit 501(c)(3) American Passenger Rail Heritage Foundation to provide on-board educational programs for train passengers on the South Shore Line. On select Saturdays, Interpretive Guides with the APRHF Rail Rangers ride roundtrip between Millennium Station and South Bend Airport station to provide narration about the park and the other sites passengers see outside their window.

In popular culture 
In the feature animation film The Polar Express (2004), which references several pieces of railroad history, the look of buildings on the square at the North Pole were inspired by Pullman Factory.

Notes

External links

National Park Service site
Pullman Museum
Pullman National Monument Preservation Society
Pullman Site, at Illinois Historic Preservation Agency
 National Parks Conservation Association
Society of Architectural Historians SAH ARCHIPEDIA entry on Pullman

Historic districts in Chicago
Parks in Chicago
South Side, Chicago
Illinois State Historic Sites
National Historic Landmarks in Chicago
Railroad-related National Historic Landmarks
1880s architecture in the United States
Buildings and structures on the National Register of Historic Places in Chicago
National Monuments designated by Barack Obama
Protected areas established in 2015
2015 establishments in Illinois
Chicago Landmarks
1880 establishments in Illinois
National Park Service areas in Illinois
National Historical Parks of the United States